Polistes associus is a species of paper wasps belonging to the family Vespidae.

Distribution
This species is present in central and southern Europe (Albania, Austria, Bulgaria, Croatia, European Turkey, France, Greece, Italy, Poland, Romania, Ukraine, Yugoslavia), in the Near East, and in the Oriental realm.

Description

These wasps are characterized by very light eyes, the ocelli arranged according to an equilateral triangle, completely black mandibles and yellow lateral parts (genae) of the head. The dorsal surface of antennae is black in both sexes, with wide and deep longitudinal groove. Clypeus is uniformly yellow, markedly depressed, with a distinct longitudinal ridge and a black stripe.

The 6th sternit is black. The ventral part of the last abdominal segment is reddish-brown withs an apical lighter spot.

The males are easily distinguishable by the combination of narrow temples and a markedly depressed clypeus. The dorsal length of the apical antennal segment is longer than in similar species.

This species is very similar to Polistes nimpha. For this reason the recognition of P. associus females may be problematic.

Biology
These wasps parasitizes other Polistes wasps of multiple species, especially Polistes atrimandibularis. and they are parasitized by Strepsiptera species.

References 

associus
Hymenoptera of Europe
Insects described in 1898